Prionacalus is a genus of beetles in the family Cerambycidae, containing the following species:

Species
 Prionacalus atys White, 1850
 Prionacalus cacicus White, 1845
 Prionacalus demelti Quentin & Villiers, 1983
 Prionacalus inermus Komiya & Santos-Silva, 2018
 Prionacalus iphis White, 1850
 Prionacalus uniformis Waterhouse, 1900
 Prionacalus whymperi Bates in Whymper, 1892
 Prionacalus woytkowskii (Heyrovsky, 1960)

Distribution
This genus is restricted to western South America from Colombia to northern Argentina.

References

 Antonio Santos-Silva, Ziro Komiya and Eugenio H. Nearns  Revision of the Genus Prionacalus White, 1845 (Coleoptera: Cerambycidae: Prioninae: Prionini) 

Prioninae